The shortlists for the 2017 CONCACAF Awards were announced on 22 November 2017. The results were announced on 18 and 19 December 2017.

Women's football awards

Player of the Year

Goalkeeper of the Year

Best XI

Coach of the Year

Referee of the Year

Men's football awards

Player of the Year

Notes

Goalkeeper of the Year

Best XI

Coach of the Year

Referee of the Year

Mixed-sex

Goal Of The Year

Outstanding Performance Award
The Outstanding Performance Award was excluded from the Nomination and Voting Processes, and was selected by CONCACAF.
  and  Hernán Darío Gómez

References

CONCACAF trophies and awards
Awards
CONCACAF